GNJ may refer to:
 GainJet Aviation
 Greater New Jersey Conference